Kärasi Nature Reserve is a nature reserve which is located in Jõgeva County, Estonia.

The area of the nature reserve is 598 ha.

The protected area was founded in 1996 to protect valuable habitat types and threatened species in Kärasi, Piilsi, Separa and Tammispää village (all in former Lohusuu Parish).

References

Nature reserves in Estonia
Geography of Jõgeva County